An annular solar eclipse occurred at the Moon's ascending node of the orbit on Wednesday, August 22, 1979. A solar eclipse occurs when the Moon passes between Earth and the Sun, thereby totally or partly obscuring the image of the Sun for a viewer on Earth. An annular solar eclipse occurs when the Moon's apparent diameter is smaller than the Sun's, blocking most of the Sun's light and causing the Sun to look like an annulus (ring). An annular eclipse appears as a partial eclipse over a region of the Earth thousands of kilometres wide. A small annular eclipse covered only 93% of the Sun in a very broad path, 953 km wide at maximum, and lasted 6 minutes and 3 seconds. This was the second solar eclipse in 1979, the first one a total solar eclipse on February 26.

This was the last of 40 umbral eclipses of Solar Saros 125. The first was in 1276 and the last was in 1979. The total duration is 703 years.

Related eclipses

Eclipses in 1979 
 A total solar eclipse on Monday, 26 February 1979.
 A partial lunar eclipse on Tuesday, 13 March 1979.
 An annular solar eclipse on Wednesday, 22 August 1979.
 A total lunar eclipse on Thursday, 6 September 1979.

Solar eclipses 1979–1982 
Each member in a semester series of solar eclipses repeats approximately every 177 days and 4 hours (a semester) at alternating nodes of the Moon's orbit.
<noinclude>

Saros 125

Tritos series

Metonic series

Notes

References

1979 8 22
1979 in science
1979 8 22
August 1979 events